The 2011–12 Tulsa Oilers season was the 20th season in the Central Hockey League for the professional ice hockey franchise in Tulsa, Oklahoma.

Regular season

Conference standings

See also
 2011–12 CHL season

References

External links
 2011–12 Tulsa Oilers season at Pointstreak

Tulsa Oilers
Tulsa Oilers